The 2015–16 Liiga season was the 41st season of the Liiga (formerly SM-liiga), the top level of ice hockey in Finland, since the league's formation in 1975.

Teams

Regular season
Top six advanced straight to quarter-finals, while teams between 7th and 10th positions played wild card round for the final two spots. The Liiga is a closed series and thus there is no relegation.

Rules for classification: 1) Points; 2) 3-point wins 3) Goal difference; 4) Goals scored; 4) Head-to-head points.

Playoffs

Bracket

Wild card round (best-of-three)

(7) TPS vs. (10) Sport 

TPS wins the series 2-0.

(8) KalPa vs. (9) Pelicans

Pelicans wins the series 2-1.

Quarterfinals (best-of-seven)

(1) HIFK vs. (9) Pelicans

HIFK wins the series 4-2.

(2) Kärpät vs. (7) TPS

Kärpät wins the series 4-2.

(3) Tappara vs. (6) Lukko

Tappara wins the series 4-1.

(4) JYP  vs. (5) SaiPa

JYP wins the series 4-2.

Semifinals (best-of-seven)

(1) HIFK vs. (4) JYP 

HIFK wins the series 4-2.

(2) Kärpät vs. (3) Tappara

Tappara wins the series 4-3.

Bronze medal game

Finals (best-of-seven) 

Tappara wins the finals 4–2.

Final rankings

References

External links
Official site of the Liiga

Liiga seasons
Liiga
Liiga